Ereğli station ( is a railway station in the town of Ereğli in Konya Province. Once served by several train lines that have destinations to Istanbul, İzmir and Konya, the station is currently served by Toros Ekspresi  only, which connects Ereğli to Adana and Karaman. The station will be popular again after the completion of the Konya-Ereğli section of the Konya-Gaziantep highspeed line.

Images

References

External links

 Station information
 Station timetable

Railway stations in Konya Province
Ereğli (Konya) District